Anthony Fera (born  June 18, 1991) is an American football placekicker and punter who is currently a free agent.

Playing career
Hailing from Cypress, Texas, Fera attended St. Pius X High School. Fera later attended Penn State, redshirting in 2009. On November 17, 2010, Fera had an emergency appendectomy. In Penn State's 2011 game against Eastern Michigan, Fera became the first Nittany Lion since Chris Bahr in 1975 to be the starter for field goals, kickoffs and punts. After the 2011 season, Fera transferred to Texas. Fera missed the first four games of 2012 with a groin injury. Fera was a finalist for the 2013 Lou Groza Award.

After college, Fera signed as a free agent for the BC Lions on May 27, 2015, eventually joining the practice roster on June 20, 2015. He was released by the team on June 3, 2016.

On August 9, 2016, Fera was signed by the Montreal Alouettes.

References

External links
 Texas bio

American football placekickers
American football punters
Canadian football placekickers
Canadian football punters
American players of Canadian football
Penn State Nittany Lions football players
Texas Longhorns football players
BC Lions players
Montreal Alouettes players
Players of American football from Philadelphia
Players of American football from Texas
Players of Canadian football from Philadelphia
Sportspeople from Harris County, Texas
1991 births
Living people
All-American college football players